"Bella senz'anima" is an Italian ballad song written by Marco Luberti, Paolo Casella and Riccardo Cocciante, arranged by Franco Pisano and performed by Riccardo Cocciante. It was the first single from the Cocciante's 1974 album Anima.

The song was launched by Cocciante during a tour ("Racconto") he made in 1973 together with Antonello Venditti and Francesco De Gregori. The single peaked at the first place on the Italian singles chart, and it was the seventh most sold single of the year in Italy.  
 
The lyrics, and particularly the verse "E adesso spogliati come sai fare tu" (i.e. "And now strip as you know") led to harsh criticism from several feminist organizations and to television censorship.

In 2006, Cocciante performed the song out of competition at the Sanremo Music Festival.

Track listing
7-inch single – AN 4155 
A. "Bella senz'anima" (Marco Luberti, Paolo Casella, Riccardo Cocciante) 
B. "Qui" (Marco Luberti, Paolo Casella, Riccardo Cocciante)

Covers
 1975 - The Midnight Guitars Staff records the cover for the album Un pugno di successi (A handful of hits) (Variety, RLV ST 90503).
 2010 - Linda Valori records the cover for the album Tutti quelli (All those) (NAR International, NAR 110102).

Charts

References

 

1974 singles
1974 songs
Number-one singles in Italy
Riccardo Cocciante songs
Songs written by Riccardo Cocciante
Songs written by Marco Luberti